Stjärnornas stjärna is a Swedish TV-series which is being broadcast on TV4 since 2018. Host is Petra Mede. In the series eight professional singers competes in different music genres and every week one of the singers gets voted off the series until one is the winner. The winner of the first season was Casper Janebrink.

Singers (Season 1) 
List of competing singers for the first season.

Casper Janebrink Winner
Ola Salo 2nd
LaGaylia Frazier 3rd
Tommy Nilsson 4th
Wiktoria 5th
Roger Pontare 6th
Linda Pira 7th
Ace Wilder 8th

Singers (Season 2)
List of competing singers for the second season.
 Andreas Weise Winner
 Mariette 2nd
 Peter Larsson 3rd
 Renaida 4th
 Jakob Samuel 5th
 Plura 6th
 Andreas Lundstedt 7th
 Shirley Clamp 8th

Singers (Season 3)
List of competing singers for the third season.
 David Lindgren Winner
 Jon Henrik Fjällgren 2nd
 Elisa Lindström 3rd
 Jessica Andersson 4th 
 Mapei 5th
 Nicke Borg 6th
 Nano 7th
 Amwin 8th

References

External links 
 

Swedish reality television series
TV4 (Sweden) original programming
2018 Swedish television series debuts